An outstanding Quarter Horse racehorse, Charger Bar (1968–1997) was the 1971 World Champion Quarter Running Horse and an American Quarter Horse Association (or AQHA) Superior Race Horse. She was posthumously inducted into the American Quarter Horse Hall of Fame.

Background
Charger Bar was foaled in 1968, a bay filly sired by Tiny Charger and out of a daughter of Rocket Bar (TB) named La Ree Bar. Her sire was a son of Depth Charge (TB) out of a descendant of Clabber.

Racing career
Charger Bar's racing record was forty-three starts in six years. She won twenty-eight of her races, and placed second in three and third in six. She earned a total of $495,437.00 in purse money. Charger Bar beat Kaweah Bar three times in her racing career. She was undefeated in 1971, and was named World Champion Quarter Running Horse. Other honors included being named Champion Quarter Running Mare in 1972, 1973 and 1974. She also earned 144 AQHA racing points, which earned her the title of Superior Race Horse from the AQHA.

Breeding record and honors
Charger Bar went on to produce fourteen foals. Of those foals, twelve started races, and ten earned Register of Merits and ten won races. Among her foals were Proud Heritage, Go Proudly, and Blushing By. Her offspring earned a total of $626,076.00 on the racetrack. She died November 26, 1997 and her ashes were scattered over the infield at the Los Alamitos racetrack.

In 2001 Charger Bar was inducted into the AQHA Hall of Fame.

Pedigree

Notes

References

 
 All Breed Pedigree Database Pedigree of Charger Bar retrieved on June 30, 2007

External links
 Charger Bar at Quarter Horse Directory
 Charger Bar at Quarter Horse Legends

American Quarter Horse racehorses
American Quarter Horse broodmares
1968 racehorse births
1997 racehorse deaths
AQHA Hall of Fame (horses)